This is a list of Netherlands women Test cricketers. A Test match is an international cricket match between two of the leading cricketing nations. This list contains every women to have played Test cricket for Netherlands. Their only Test was in 2007 against South Africa. The players are listed alphabetically by the surname the player was using at the time of the match.

Key

Test cricketers
Statistics are correct as of the Netherlands women's only Test match, against South Africa on 28 July 2007.

References

  
Netherlands
Cricketers, women test
Cricketers, test